Reflections is a solo piano album recorded in 1965 by Abdullah Ibrahim (then known as Dollar Brand).

Recording and music
The album was recorded in March 1965. It was Abdullah Ibrahim's first solo piano album.

Release
Reflections was released by Black Lion Records. Ibrahim was still known as Dollar Brand, so it was under that name that the album was issued.

Reception

AllMusic put the recording in historical context: "These largely introspective performances do not contain the joyful folk melodies of Ibrahim's later work but they offer a fascinating early look into the music of the important stylist." The Penguin Guide to Jazz commented on the pianist's "drumming lyricism".

Track listing
"Honeysuckle Rose" (Andy Razaf/Fats Waller) – 3:45
"Resolution" (Dollar Brand) – 3:43
"Knight's Night" (Brand) – 5:38
"Mood Indigo (Barney Bigard/Duke Ellington/Irving Mills)/Don't Get Around Much Anymore (Ellington/Bob Russell)/Take the 'A' Train" (Billy Strayhorn) – 8:34
"Monk's Mood" (Thelonious Monk) – 4:47
"You Are Too Beautiful" (Lorenz Hart/Richard Rodgers) – 6:10
"Little Niles" (Randy Weston) – 5:58
"Pye R Squared" (Brand) – 2:52
"On the Banks of Allen Waters" (Brand) – 5:39
"Reflections" (Thelonious Monk) – 4:06
"Which Way?" (Brand) – 3:09

Personnel
Abdullah Ibrahim – piano

References

Abdullah Ibrahim albums
Solo piano jazz albums